The Building of the Assembly of the Municipality of Strumica is the seat of the Strumica Municipality and a cultural heritage of North Macedonia.
 
During the early years of Yugoslavia, the local government of Strumica did not yet have its own seat. The construction of the Municipality House officially started in 1926 when the foundations were laid.

External links 
 Old Architecture, Strumica Municipality 

Buildings and structures in Strumica
Government buildings in North Macedonia